Dance For Me or Dance 4 Me may refer to:

Music

Albums
Dance for Me, a 2002 remix album by Mary J. Blige

Songs
 "Dance 4 Me", promo single by Prince
 "Dance 4 Me", song by Mark Morrison from Innocent Man 2007
 "Dance for Me" (Empire Mates Entertainment song), a 2012 song by artists of Nigerian record label Empire Mates Entertainment
 "Dance for Me" (Sisqó song), a 2001 song by Sisqó
 "Dance for Me" (Mary J. Blige song), a 2001 song by Mary J. Blige
 "Dance for Me", song by The Court Jesters	1967
 "Dance for Me", song by Fire and Rain	1976
 "Dance for Me", song by Robert Palmer	1985
 "Dance for Me", song by Queen Latifah 1989
 "Dance for Me", song by Alma featuring MØ 2018